The  is one of eight active brigades of the Japan Ground Self-Defense Force. The brigade is subordinated to the Northern Army and is headquartered in Obihiro, Hokkaidō. Its responsibility is the defense of North Eastern Hokkaidō.

The brigade was formed on 29 March 2004 with units from the disbanded 5th Infantry Division.

Organization 

 5th Brigade, in Obihiro
 5th Brigade HQ, in Obihiro
 5th Tank Battalion, in Shikaoi, with three Squadrons of Type 90 Main Battle Tanks
 4th Infantry Regiment note 1, in Obihiro
 6th Infantry Regiment, in Bihoro
 27th Infantry Regiment, in Kushiro
 5th Artillery Battalion, in Obihiro, with three batteries of Type 99 155mm Self-propelled howitzers
 5th Reconnaissance Company, in Betsukai, with Type 87 Armored Reconnaissance Vehicle
 5th Anti-Aircraft Artillery Company, in Obihiro, with Type 81 and Type 93 Surface-to-air missile systems
 5th Combat Engineer Company, in Obihiro
 5th Signal Company, in Obihiro
 5th Aviation Squadron, in Obihiro, flying UH-1J and OH-6D helicopters
 5th NBC Defense Company, in Obihiro
 5th Logistic Support Battalion, in Obihiro

note 1: Infantry Regiments have only battalion strength.

External links
 Homepage 5th Brigade (Japanese)

Japan Ground Self-Defense Force Brigade
Military units and formations established in 2004